Headingley and Hyde Park is an electoral ward of Leeds City Council in Leeds, West Yorkshire, covering the inner-city area of Hyde Park (traditionally known as Wrangthorn, the name still used by the Church of England) and suburb of Headingley to the north of the city centre. It was created in advance of the 2018 council election.

Councillors 

 indicates seat up for election.
* indicates current incumbent councillor.

Elections since 2018

May 2022

May 2021

May 2019

May 2018

Notes

References

Wards of Leeds